Illinois Route 128 is a north–south state route in east-central Illinois. It runs from Interstate 70 in Altamont to Illinois Route 121 in Dalton City.

Route description 
Illinois 128 is a two-lane, rural surface road for its entire length. Immediately north of Interstate 70, it overlaps U.S. Route 40 for 3 miles (5 km). It is also concurrent with Illinois Route 16 near Shelbyville.

Illinois 128 may or may not run through Moultrie County, depending on its exact routing, as the route appears to run along portions of the Shelby/Moultrie and Macon/Moultrie county lines.

History 
SBI Route 128 originally ran from U.S. Route 40 (originally Illinois Route 11) to Illinois 16 west of Shelbyville. In March 1937, it replaced IL 169 north of Shelbyville to Dalton City. Finally, as Interstate 70 was being built in the 1950s and 1960s, it was extended along U.S. 40 to Altamont.

Major Intersections

References 

128
Transportation in Effingham County, Illinois
Transportation in Fayette County, Illinois
Transportation in Shelby County, Illinois
Transportation in Macon County, Illinois
Transportation in Moultrie County, Illinois